David Hawk may refer to:

 David B. Hawk (born 1968), American politician in Tennessee
 David L. Hawk (born 1948), American management theorist, architect and systems scientist

See also
David Hawkes (disambiguation)